The 1936–37 Divizia A was the twenty-fifth season of Divizia A, the top-level football league of Romania.

Teams

League table

Note
No team was relegated because 1937–38 Divizia A was expanded to 20 Teams (2 Groups of 10).

Results

Top goalscorers

Champion squad

See also 

Liga II#List of champions and promoted teams
 1936–37 Divizia B
 1936–37 Divizia C

References

Liga I seasons
1936–37 in Romanian football
Romania